Paopi 17 - Coptic Calendar - Paopi 19

The eighteenth day of the Coptic month of Paopi, the second month of the Coptic year. On a common year, this day corresponds to October 15, of the Julian Calendar, and October 28, of the Gregorian Calendar. This day falls in the Coptic season of Peret, the season of emergence.

Commemorations

Saints 

 The departure of Pope Theophilus I, the twenty-third Patriarch of the See of Saint Mark

References 

Days of the Coptic calendar